Ali Cobrin (born ) is an American actress. She is best known for her role as Molly in the Showtime series Look: The Series, as Kara in the 2012 film American Reunion, and as Whitney in the 2014 film Neighbors.

Early life
Cobrin was born and raised in Chicago, Illinois. She attended high school at the Chicago Academy for the Arts where she majored in musical theatre. Growing up, she trained to become a classical ballerina and competed in the Junior Olympics. Cobrin has one brother, and two half-sisters. She is of Jewish descent.

Career
Cobrin began her entertainment career as an improvisation player in Second City's teen ensemble and danced with the Burklyn Ballet Theater touring Scotland, where she performed at the Edinburgh Fringe Festival. During that same time, Cobrin had workshopped Broadway musicals, including All That Jazz and Wonderland, which were directed by Ben Vereen and Frank Wildhorn, respectively. After graduating high school at the age of 17, Cobrin moved to Los Angeles, California to pursue an acting career.

Upon moving to Los Angeles, Cobrin had her first film acting role in a 2008 short film entitled One. That same year, she starred in another short film called Jack Turner and the Reluctant Vampire, which won two awards in the Los Angeles Accolade Competition. In 2009, Cobrin had a supporting role in The Hole, a 3D film directed by Joe Dante. The film would win the first Premio Persol award for best 3-D movie at the 2009 Venice Film Festival. In 2010, Cobrin made her debut television appearance in Kings by Night, a comedy pilot for Spike TV, and Showtime's LOOK. Later that year, she had a lead actress role in the film Cold Cabin, and appeared opposite to rapper B.o.B in the Adidas Originals shoe campaign commercial, MEGA Diner. In 2011, she guest starred in the television series, Friends with Benefits. In 2012, Cobrin had a supporting role in American Reunion, a sequel in the original American Pie film series. The same year, she starred in Life’s an Itch. In 2015, she portrayed Kylie Atkins in Trevor Matthews' horror thriller film Girl House, in which she co-starred with Slaine. She portrayed also Joan in the drama thriller film Outlaw, which was directed by Todd Shields and Julia in Michaël Nakache drama film Connected.

Filmography

References

External links
 
 

1989 births
American television actresses
Living people
21st-century American actresses
American film actresses
Actresses from Chicago
Jewish American actresses